This article describes some of the longest words in the Spanish language.

Esternocleidooccipitomastoideos (31 letters) is the plural of the noun esternocleidooccipitomastoideo, which is the sternocleidomastoid, a muscle in the human neck. The word has a 22-letter synonym: esternocleidomastoideo, which is shorter because it omits the Latin prefix  ('occipital'). Both words are abbreviated as ECOM.

The 24-letter word , plural of electroencefalografista, means 'electroencephalographists' or 'electroencephalographers': specialists in the brain measurement technology of electroencephalography (EEG).

The 23-letter adverb anticonstitucionalmente means 'anticonstitutionally'. Anticonstitucionalmente is also the Portuguese translation; the French translation, anticonstitutionnellement, is an exceptionally long word as well (25 letters).

Long words

In the table below, all of the Spanish nouns except for  can be pluralised by adding an s (es for ) to the end. The adjective  can also be pluralised with an s; the plurals of the other adjectives end in es.

The RAE column indicates whether the Real Academia Española lists and defines the word in the Diccionario de la lengua española, its official dictionary.

See also

References

External links
 Words of specified length
 Words of specified length in Spanish

Spanish words and phrases
Word in Spanish
Spanish